Cymbium olla, commonly known as the Algarve volute, is a species of sea snail, a marine gastropod mollusk in the family Volutidae, the volutes.
The fermented and dried flesh, called ‘’yeet’’ has a pungent smell, and is used in the Senegalese traditional Thieboudienne.

Description

Distribution

References

 Lowe R.T. (1861). A list of shells observed or collected at Mogador and in its immediate environs, during a few days' visit to the place, in April 1859. Proceedings of the Zoological Society of London 1860: 169-204
 Pallary, P., 1930. Révision du genre Yetus. Annales du Musée d'Histoire Naturelle de Marseille 22(3): 53–77
 Gofas, S.; Le Renard, J.; Bouchet, P. (2001). Mollusca. in: Costello, M.J. et al. (eds), European Register of Marine Species: a check-list of the marine species in Europe and a bibliography of guides to their identification. Patrimoines Naturels. 50: 180-213.
 Bail, P.; Poppe, G.T. (2001). A conchological iconography: a taxonomic introduction of the recent Volutidae. ConchBooks, Hackenheim. 30 pp, 5 pl.

External links
 Syntype at the MNHN, Paris
 Linnaeus, C. (1758). Systema Naturae per regna tria naturae, secundum classes, ordines, genera, species, cum characteribus, differentiis, synonymis, locis. Editio decima, reformata [10th revised edition, vol. 1: 824 pp. Laurentius Salvius: Holmiae]
 Schumacher C.F. (1817). Essai d'un nouveau système des habitations des vers testacés. Schultz, Copenghagen. iv + 288 pp., 22 pls.
 Röding P.F. (1798). Museum Boltenianum sive Catalogus cimeliorum e tribus regnis naturæ quæ olim collegerat Joa. Fried Bolten, M. D. p. d. per XL. annos proto physicus Hamburgensis. Pars secunda continens Conchylia sive Testacea univalvia, bivalvia & multivalvia. Trapp, Hamburg. viii, 199 pp

Volutidae
Gastropods described in 1758
Taxa named by Carl Linnaeus